is a department store chain in the Kansai region, Japan. It is headquartered in Abenosuji Itchome, Abeno-ku, Osaka, Japan.

History
January, 1920:  was opened in front of Kyoto Station.
February, 1920:  was founded.
1926:  opened its own restaurant at Daiki Building in Uehommachi, Osaka.
1930: Kyoto Bussankan General Partnership opened branch store in Yanagase, Gifu.
September, 1931: Kyoto Bussankan General Partnership was renamed .
1934:  founded .
September, 1936:  was opened in Uehommachi, Osaka.
November, 1937: Daitetsu Department Store was opened in Abeno, Osaka.
March, 1941: Daiki consolidated Sangu Kyuko Railway Company and was renamed , thus, Daiki Department Store was renamed .
June 1, 1944: Kankyu and Nankai Railway were consolidated to form .
September, 1960:  was opened in front of Beppu Station.
July 1, 1961: Beppu Kintetsu Kaikan was renamed .
March 14, 1972: Kintetsu Department Store Nara was opened near Yamato-Saidaiji Station.
April, 1972:  was founded.
June 1, 1972: The department store business in Osaka and Nara was transferred to Kintetsu Department Store from Kintetsu.
May 11, 1974:  was opened in front of Kichijoji Station in Musashino, Tokyo.
May, 1977: Marubutsu Company was renamed .
October 5, 1978: Kintetsu Department Store Higashiosaka was opened in the same location as Fuse Station.
November 15, 1982: Kintetsu Department Store Nishi-Kyoto was opened in Kyoto Family, Ukyo-ku, Kyoto.
April 25, 1987: Kintetsu Department Store Kashihara was opened near Yamato-Yagi Station.
March 1, 1991: Kintetsu Department Store Co., Ltd. consolidated Beppu Kintetsu Department Store Co., Ltd.
April 12, 1991: Kintetsu Department Store Sakurai was opened.
March 31, 1994: Kintetsu Department Store Sakurai was closed.
August 31, 1994: Kintetsu Department Store Beppu was closed.
February 28, 1995: Kintetsu Department Store Nishi-Kyoto was closed.
November 26, 1996: Kintetsu Department Store Momoyama was opened near Rokujizo Station.
March 19, 1997: Kintetsu Department Store Ikoma was opened.
September 1, 1998:  Kintetsu Department Store Co., Ltd. consolidated Hirakata Kintetsu Department Store Co., Ltd.
September 28, 1998: Kintetsu Department Store Kikyogaoka was opened.
September 30, 1999: Kyoto Kintetsu Department Store Gifu was closed.
March 25, 2000: Kyoto Kintetsu Department Store Kyoto was renewed and opened as "Platz Kintetsu".
September 1, 2000: "Hoop" was opened in the south of the department store in Abeno, Osaka.
February 20, 2001: Kintetsu Department Store Tokyo was closed.
February 28, 2001: Kyoto Kintetsu Department Store Co., Ltd. consolidated former Kintetsu Department Store Co., Ltd. Kyoto Kintetsu was renamed Kintetsu Department Store Co., Ltd., and relocated its head office at Osaka Abenobashi Station in Abeno-ku, Osaka.
February 28, 2007: Kintetsu Department Store Kyoto (Platz Kintetsu) was closed.
March, 2008: The destruction of Kintetsu Department Store Kyoto (Platz Kintetsu) was finished.
September 9, 2008: "Abeno Natural Days (Abeno and)" was opened in the south of Hoop in Abeno-ku, Osaka.
March 1, 2009: Kintetsu Department Store Co., Ltd. consolidated Chubu Kintetsu Department Store Co. (subsidiary of Kintetsu Department Store Co., Ltd.) and Wakayama Kintetsu Department Store Co. (in front of JR Wakayama Station, subsidiary of Kintetsu Corporation).
former Chubu Kintetsu Department Store - located in Nagoya (Aichi Prefecture), Yokkaichi (Mie Prefecture) and Kusatsu (Shiga Prefecture)
former Wakayama Kintetsu Department Store - located in Wakayama (Wakayama Prefecture)
February 29, 2012: Kintetsu Department Store Hirakata was closed.
June 13, 2013: Kintetsu Department Store Abeno was reopened and renamed "Kintetsu Department Store Main Store Abeno Harukas" (pre-opening).
February 22, 2014: The renovation was finished at the Main Store Abeno Harukas Wing Building, preparing for the opening of Abeno Harukas on March 7.

Stores
Main Store Abeno Harukas - Abenobashi Terminal Building, Abenosuji Itchome, Abeno-ku, Osaka
The same location as Ōsaka Abenobashi Station on the Minami Osaka Line, and close to Tennoji Station on the three lines of West Japan Railway Company (JR West) and the two lines of Osaka Municipal Subway. Located on the lower level floors of 60-story skyscraper Abeno Harukas. It houses the largest floor area of any department store in Japan. The store was renamed from "Kintetsu Department Store Abeno" on the pre-opening day, June 13, 2013.
Uehommachi - Uehommachi Rokuchome, Tennoji-ku, Osaka
The same location as Ōsaka Uehommachi Station on the Osaka Line
Higashiosaka - Ajiro, Higashiosaka, the first floor of Fuse Station on the Osaka Line and the Nara Line
Nara - NaRa Family, Saidaiji-higashimachi, Nara, close to Yamato-Saidaiji Station on the Nara Line, the Kyoto Line and the Kashihara Line
Kashihara - Kita-Yagicho, Kashihara, close to Yamato-Yagi Station on the Osaka Line and the Kashihara Line
Ikoma - Tanidacho, Ikoma, close to Ikoma Station on the Nara Line, the Ikoma Line and the Keihanna Line
Momoyama (MOMO) - Momoyamacho Yamanoshita, Fushimi-ku, Kyoto, close to Rokujizo Station on the West Japan Railway Company (JR West) Nara Line, the Keihan Railway Uji Line, and the Kyoto Municipal Subway Tōzai Line
Kusatsu - Shibukawa, Kusatsu, close to Kusatsu Station operated by West Japan Railway Company (JR West) (Tokaido Line (Biwako Line), Kusatsu Line)
Wakayama - Tomodacho, Wakayama, close to Wakayama Station operated by West Japan Railway Company (JR West) (Kisei Line, Hanwa Line, Wakayama Railway Kishigawa Line)
Yokkaichi - Suwa-Sakaemachi, Yokkaichi, the same location as Kintetsu Yokkaichi Station on the Nagoya Line
Shop Kikyogaoka - Kintetsu Plaza Kikyogaoka, Kikyogaoka Ichibancho, Nabari, close to Kikyogaoka Station on the Kintetsu Osaka Line
Nagoya (Kintetsu Pass'e) - Meieki, Nakamura-ku, Nagoya, the same location as Kintetsu Nagoya Station on the Kintetsu Nagoya Line

Related stores
Hoop - Abenosuji, Abeno-ku, Osaka, the south of Ōsaka Abenobashi Station
and (Abeno Natural Days) - Abenosuji, Abeno-ku, Osaka, the south of "Hoop"
Star Island - Suwa-Sakaemachi, Yokkaichi, close to Kintetsu Yokkaichi Station
Uehommachi Yufura - Uehommachi Rokuchome, Tennoji-ku, Osaka, the south of Kintetsu Department Store Uehommachi and Osaka Uehommachi Station.

Former stores
Tokyo (1974-2001) - Kichijoji-honcho, Musashino, at the present Yodobashi Kichijoji.  close to Kichijoji Station on the East Japan Railway Company (JR East) Chuo Line, the Keio Corporation Inokashira Line
Nishi-Kyoto (1982-1995) - Ukyo-ku, Kyoto, inside Kyoto Family
Sakurai (1991-1994)
Beppu (1960-1994) - close to Beppu Station on the Kyushu Railway Company (JR Kyushu) Nippo Main Line

Former Marubutsu
Kyoto (former Marubutsu, former Kyoto Kintetsu Department Store) (1920-2007) - Shimogyo-ku, Kyoto, at the present Kyoto Yodobashi
Kyoto Kintetsu Department Store Gifu (former Marubutsu Gifu) - Yanagase, Gifu, at the present Gifu Chunichi Building
Hirakata (former Hirakata Marubutsu) (1975-2012) - Oka-higashicho, Hirakata, close to Hirakatashi Station on the Keihan Electric Railway Keihan Main Line, at the present Hirakata T-SITE
Tokyo Marubutsu stores (present PARCO)
Ikebukuro (1958-1969) - close to Ikebukuro Station, at the present PARCO Ikebukuro
Shinjuku (-1965) - along Yasukuni-dori, at the present Isetan Shinjuku Men's Building
Shibuya (-1969) - Udagawasho, Shibuya, at the present Shibuya PARCO
Toyohashi Marubutsu (-1973) - close to Toyohashi Station on Central Japan Railway Company (JR Central)
Yahata Marubutsu (-1969) - Yahatahigashi-ku, Kitakyushu

See also
Kintetsu Group Holdings

References

External links

 
Floor guide to Kintetsu Main Department Store in Abeno Harukas in English
Corporate information in English

Department stores of Japan
Companies listed on the Tokyo Stock Exchange
Companies listed on the Osaka Exchange
Companies based in Osaka Prefecture
Kintetsu Group Holdings